Gísladóttir is a surname of Icelandic origin, meaning daughter of Gísli. In Icelandic names, it is not strictly a surname, but a matronymic. The name can refer to:
Ingibjörg Sólrún Gísladóttir (b. 1954), Icelandic politician; mayor of Reykjavík 1994-2003; foreign minister of Iceland since 2007
Ragnhildur Gísladóttir, Icelandic pop singer
Sigurlaug Gísladóttir (b. 1984), Icelandic singer and songwriter

See also
Gíslason

Surnames
Icelandic-language surnames